Pampa del Tamarugal National Reserve is a nature reserve of northern Chile's Tarapacá Region located in the Pampa del Tamarugal, about  east of Iquique. 
The reserve consists of three separate sectors: Zapiga, Bosque Nativo de La Tirana, and Pintados. The major highlights are the artificially planted  forests of the genus Prosopis (primarily Prosopis tamarugo), found in the middle of a rainless desert, and the Pintados geoglyphs.

The total protected area extends on more than 102,264 hectares.

The sectors of Zapiga and Pintados are crossed by the Pan-American Highway and Sector Bosque Nativo de La Tirana can be accessed from A-665 Route.

Sites
Geoglifos de Pintados: Precolumbian culture geoglyphs extended on 2 miles that portrait more than 350 figures representing men, animals and abstract figures. Visit schedule: Mondays to Sundays, from 10:30 AM to 17:30 PM. There is an entrance fee.

See also
La Tirana
Huara
Pica

References

 Reserva Nacional Pampa del Tamarugal

National reserves of Chile
Protected areas of Tarapacá Region
Atacama Desert